The Founding of an Army is a 2017 Chinese historical drama produced by the China Film Group Corporation to commemorate the 90th anniversary of the founding of the People's Liberation Army. Produced by Han Sanping and directed by Andrew Lau, it is the third installment of the Founding of New China trilogy, along with The Founding of a Republic (2009) and The Founding of a Party (2011). The film features a star-studded cast of Chinese actors. It was released on July 28, 2017, to mark the 90th anniversary of the founding of the People's Liberation Army.

Plot
The story begins in 1927 at the beginning of the Nanchang uprising, known as the first major Kuomintang–Communist engagement.

Cast

Liu Ye as Mao Zedong
Zhu Yawen as Zhou Enlai
Huang Zhizhong as Zhu De
Wang Jingchun as He Long
Oho Ou as Ye Ting
Liu Haoran as Su Yu
Ma Tianyu as Lin Biao
Xiao Ai as Ye Jianying
Lay Zhang as Lu Deming
Li Yifeng as He Changgong  
Bai Yu as Cai Qingchuan 
Liang Dawei as Chen Geng
Yu Hewei as Chen Duxiu
Wu Yue as Zhang Guotao
Bai Ke as Di Qiubai
Liu Xun Zi Mo as Cai Hesen
Dong Zijian as Deng Xiaoping
Chen Xiao as Ren Bishi
Zhang Dapeng as Liu Bocheng
Bao Jianfeng as Tan Pingchuan
Song Yang as Wang Shouhua
Ye Xiaowei as Chen Yi
Ashton Chen as Nie Rongzhen
Li Xian as Luo Ronghang
Li Mincheng as Zhou Yiqun
Wang Zhao as Tan Zheng
Li Qin as Yang Kaihui
Song Jia as Soong Ching-ling
Guan Xiaotong as Deng Yingchao  
Ma Yili as Xiang Jingyu
Zhou Dongyu as Fan Jiaxia
Feng Wenjuan as Peng Yuanhua 
Wang Qinxiang as Zhang Zuolin 
Han Geng as Zhang Xueliang
Wang Ting as Si Lie
Michael Chen as Si Li 
Cao Kefan
Daniel Wu as Hu Hanming
Wallace Huo as Chiang Kai-shek
Zhang Tianai as Soong Mei-ling
Zhang Junhan as Chen Lifu
Yu Shaoqun as Wang Jingwei 
William Chan as Triad boss
Zhang Hanyu as Du Yuesheng 
Zhou Yiwei
Yu Ailei as Zhang Fakui
Marc Ma as Zhao Fusheng 
Tony Yang as Qian Dajun 
Huang Shang-Ho
Joseph Cheng as Yu Jishi
Lu Han as Lian luo yuan (Liaison Officer)
Tong Ruihuan as Zeng Zhongming
Zheng Kai
Winston Chao 
Liu Zhibing
Alex Fong
Tang Baoqiang
Ma Zhengqiang
Wang Zhifei

Release

Critical response
On July 25, 2017, film director Ye Daying, the grandson of General Ye Ting, criticized the film on Sina Weibo as follows: "The revolutionary history is seriously entertaining. It is a reproach and distortion of the revolutionary history." Ye Daying also sent an open letter to the State Administration of Press, Publication, Radio, Film and Television (SAPPRFT), which was signed by more than 25 revolutionary successors, many of them are generations of higher military officials. They demanded an apology to their family from the producer.

The page of the film on Douban, the leading film review website in China, has forbidden any rating or comment by its users since July 2017.

Asian release
This film was only released in Southeast Asia within Malaysia, Brunei Darussalam, and Estonia before the ASEAN international film exhibit.

Soundtrack

Awards and nominations

References

External links

 

2017 films
Chinese historical films
Chinese propaganda films
Films set in the 1920s
Films directed by Andrew Lau
China Film Group Corporation films
Cultural depictions of Mao Zedong
Cultural depictions of Zhou Enlai
Cultural depictions of Deng Xiaoping
Cultural depictions of Chiang Kai-shek
2010s Mandarin-language films